Muramvya is a city located in central Burundi. It is the capital city of Muramvya Province.

Populated places in Burundi